Eisfeld is a town and a municipality in the district of Hildburghausen, in Thuringia, Germany. It is situated on the river Werra, 12 km east of Hildburghausen, and 19 km north of Coburg. The former municipality Sachsenbrunn was merged into Eisfeld in January 2019.

Sons and daughters of the city
 Georg Rhau (1488–1548), book printer and Thomaskantor
  (1787–1853), draftsman and chalcographer
 Otto Ludwig (1813–1865), writer
  (2006 - present), Bodybuilder and Malibu enjoyer

References

Hildburghausen (district)
Duchy of Saxe-Meiningen